Triangle of Darkness is a Canadian animated short film, directed by Marie-Noëlle Moreau Robidas and released in 2022. A meditation on the loneliness and isolation that can affect people in times of crisis, the film centres on a homeless woman (Pol Pelletier) who takes shelter in an abandoned house during the January 1998 North American ice storm, only to find unexpected companionship.

The film was screened in Telefilm Canada's annual Not Short on Talent program at the 2022 Clermont-Ferrand International Short Film Festival industry market in February 2022, in advance of its official premiere at the Saguenay International Short Film Festival in March.

Awards
The film won the Audience Award at the 2022 Sommets du cinéma d'animation, and received an honorable mention from the jury for the Best Animated Short award at the 2022 Les Percéides.

The film was a Canadian Screen Award nominee for Best Animated Short at the 11th Canadian Screen Awards in 2023.

References

2022 animated films
2022 films
2020s animated short films
2022 short films
Canadian animated short films
Quebec films
2020s Canadian films
2020s French-language films
French-language Canadian films